Sniper is a 1931 Soviet drama film directed and written by Semyon Timoshenko.

Plot 
The film begins during the First World War. A former metallurgist goes to France as part of the Russian Expeditionary Force and there he kills a German sniper. Examining the documents of the sniper, he learns that the dead man also worked at a metallurgical plant, as a result of which he comes to the idea of the need for solidarity between the workers. After the war, returning to his homeland - to Russia, where he is employed by a brigade leader at the depot at the railway border station. Suddenly a group of bandits attacked the station. Defending himself and the station, the protagonist destroys the leader of the gang, who turns out to be his former commander.

Cast 
 Boris Shlikhting as The Captain
 Pyotr Sobolevsky as The Soldier
 Pyotr Kirillov as German Sniper
 Vladimir Gardin as Colonel
 Emil Gal as French officer
 Pyotr Pirogov as Worker
 Leonid Kmit as Worker Viktor

References

External links 

1931 films
1930s Russian-language films
Soviet drama films
1931 drama films
Soviet black-and-white films